"Lifetime" is a song recorded by Canadian rock band Three Days Grace for their seventh studio album, Explosions. It was released on April 11, 2022, as the second single. The song was the 18th most-played song on rock radio in 2022.

Background and meaning
The band explained the message behind "Lifetime".

Guitarist Barry Stock lived in the area when the tornado struck. The band also let fans know how they can donate to a Mayfield tornado relief GoFundMe campaign as well as funding that can assist Mayfield Independent School District Students. The band is also donating a $1 from every ticket sold on their US tour to these organizations as well.

Music video
The music video for "Lifetime" was directed by Jon Vulpine. Filmed in Mayfield, Kentucky, the song was dedicated to the people affected by an EF4 tornado that hit the city in December 2021. The video shows lead singer Matt Walst walking through the city streets, where trees have been severed, houses demolished and very little was left standing. Some clips show the outcome with the local rescue shelter filled with animals that were also displaced after the tornado.

Chart performance
"Lifetime" peaked at number one on the Billboard Mainstream Rock chart tied with Shinedown with 17 number one songs on the chart and at number 8 on the Rock Airplay chart. The song also peaked at number 18 on the Alternative Digital Song Sales chart. It entered the Canada Rock chart at number 49 and peaked at number 13. The song earned 580,000 official US streams and sold 500 downloads.

Charts

Weekly charts

Year-end charts

References

2022 songs
2022 singles
Three Days Grace songs
RCA Records singles
Song recordings produced by Howard Benson
Songs written by Barry Stock
Songs written by Neil Sanderson
Songs written by Ted Bruner
Songs about natural disasters